The Great Chatsworth train wreck was a major rail accident that occurred late on the night of August 10, 1887,  east of Chatsworth, Illinois, in the United States.  A Toledo, Peoria and Western Railroad (TP&W) train bound for Niagara Falls crossed over a trestle, weakened earlier in the day by a fire, causing it to collapse.  In 2007, staff of the McLean County Museum of History wrote that "the Chatsworth Train Wreck probably ranks as the second- or third-deadliest U.S rail accident in the 19th century."

Crash 

The summer of 1887 had been hot and dry. Fearing that sparks from the steam engines of the trains could ignite brush fires, the TP&W company began performing controlled burns to prevent an uncontrollable brush fire. On the day of the accident, TP&W crews performed a controlled burn near the site of the accident—it is suspected that failure to extinguish the fire resulted in charring of the bridge.

That day, a TP&W train carried vacationers taking advantage of a special offer to visit Niagara Falls.  It had picked up passengers all along the TP&W line as far back as Iowa, and left Peoria, Illinois around 8 p.m.: Two steam engines pulled six fully-loaded wooden passenger cars, six sleeper cars, and three luggage cars.  It travelled east through Eureka and Chenoa, and did not stop at Chatsworth. Just before the accident site, the coach accelerated down a slope, reaching . The first engine successfully crossed the weakened bridge as it collapsed; the second engine crashed into the side of the hill, while each following passenger car telescoped into the next. Sleeper cars attached to the rear of the train halted just short of the bridge.

The disaster immediately made national news, including almost half of the front page of The New York Times.

Four days later, the TP&W gathered together the remaining wreckage and set it on fire. The crash resulted in the increased use of steel in passenger cars.

Historical marker 

In 1954, the state of Illinois placed a historical marker, along U.S. Route 24, commemorating the event.  The marker has the following text:

References

External links 

 Chatsworth Train Accident; August 10, 1887 at PeoriaCountyIllinois.info
 "The Great Chatsworth Train Wreck" at Chatsworth Illinois Memories
 

August 1887 events
1887 in Illinois
Accidents and incidents involving Toledo, Peoria and Western Railroad
Bridge disasters caused by fire
Bridge disasters caused by maintenance error
Bridge disasters in the United States
Livingston County, Illinois
Railway accidents and incidents in Illinois
Railway accidents in 1887